Parictis is an extinct arctoid, possibly the earliest genus of bears known, though a recent variety of morphological evidence links amphicynodontines with pinnipeds. It was a very small and graceful arctoid with a skull only 7 cm long. Parictis first appeared in North America in the Late Eocene (around 38 million years ago), but it did not arrive in Eurasia until the Miocene.   Some suggest that Parictis may have emigrated from Asia into North America during the major sea level low about 37 mya, because of the continued evolution of the Amphicynodontinae into the Hemicyoninae in Asia. Although no Parictis fossils have been found in East Asia, Parictis does appear in Eurasia and Africa, but not until the Miocene.

Species
 P. dakotensis Clark 1936 37 Million years old
 P. gilpini Clark & Guensburg 1972 35 Million years old
 P. major  Clark & Guensburg 1972
 P. montanus Clark & Guensburg 1972 36 Million years old
 P. parvus Clark & Beerbower, 1967 38 Million years old
 P. personi Chaffee 1954 33 Million years old
 P. primaevus, Scott 1893 Although Hall (1931) thought to reassign this species to the Canidae, Hunt (1998) clearly places it within the Ursidae, under Parictis.

Formerly classed under Parictis
 P. bathygenus White 1947 is no longer considered a species of Parictis, having been reassigned to the genus Cynelos, in the Amphicyonidae ("bear dog") family.

References

Miocene bears
Eocene bears
Oligocene bears
Miocene genus extinctions
Transitional fossils
Eocene carnivorans
Eocene mammals of North America
Prehistoric carnivoran genera